NHB or nhb may refer to:

 No holds barred (disambiguation), a term originating in catch wrestling that has also been applied to modern mixed martial arts
 National Heritage Board (Singapore), a cultural development board
 National Housing Bank, a state owned bank in India
 Naval Hospital Bremerton, a United States Navy hospital in Bremerton, Washington
 New Headquarters Building (NHB), part of the George Bush Center for Intelligence
 nhb, the ISO 639-3 designation for the Beng language